The 24th edition of the Men's Asian Amateur Boxing Championships were held from June 4 to June 10, 2007 in wrestling palace of Ulaanbaatar, Mongolia. About 140 athletes from 20 countries and regions competed for the 11 champions during seven days.

Medal summary

Medal table

References
amateur-boxing

External links
Asian Boxing Confederation

2007
Asian Boxing
Boxing
21st century in Ulaanbaatar
Sport in Ulaanbaatar
International boxing competitions hosted by Mongolia